Nuclear Psychology is an EP by the American psychedelic rock band Weird Owl, released on February 21, 2007.

Recording
The album was partially recorded at Seaside Lounge Studios in Brooklyn, New York City. The EP's cover art is a reference to the cover art for the 1973 album The Dark Side of the Moon by English rock band Pink Floyd. Trevor Tyrrell, guitarist and lead vocalist for Weird Owl, has stated that "the cover was a quick joke having more to do with our self-presumed spot in the continuum of mind-music more than it has to do with any great reverence for Floyd. We felt as if we were the sons of a certain musical father (in a collective sense) and that it was now time for the son to assert his independence".

Track listing

Personnel
Weird Owl
 Trevor Tyrrell – guitar, lead vocals
 Jon Rudd – guitar
 Kenneth Cook – bass guitar, keyboards, synths, back-up vocals
 Sean Reynolds – drums
 John Cassidy – keyboards, synths

Additional production
 Gerard Garone – recording
 Harley Zinger – recording

References

2007 EPs
Psychedelic rock EPs
Weird Owl albums